Live Gothic is the title of a live album recorded in Poland by Swedish symphonic metal band Therion released on 25 July 2008.  The album is released on two CDs and one DVD.

CD track list

Disc One
 "Der Mitternachtslöwe"
 "Schwarzalbenheim"
 "The Blood of Kingu"
 "The Falling Stone"
 "An Arrow From the Sun"
 "Deggial"
 "Wine of Aluqah"
 "The Perennial Sophia"
 "The Son of the Sun"
 "Son of the Staves of Time"
 "Birth of Venus Illegitima"
 "Tuna 1613"
 "Drum Solo"
 "Muspelheim"

Running time: 68 min

Disc Two
 "Rise of Sodom and Gomorrah"
 "Ginnungagap"
 "Grand Finale"
 "Lemuria"
 "The Wand of Abaris"
 "Nightside of Eden"
 "To Mega Therion"
 "Thor (The Powerhead) : Manowar cover"

Running time: 51 min

DVD track list

Show
 "Der Mitternachtslöwe"
 "Schwarzalbenheim"
 "The Blood of Kingu"
 "The Falling Stone"
 "An Arrow From the Sun"
 "Deggial"
 "Wine of Aluqah"
 "The Perennial Sophia"
 "The Son of the Sun"
 "Son of the Staves of Time"
 "Birth of Venus Illegitima"
 "Tuna 1613"
 "Drum Solo"
 "Muspelheim"
 "Rise of Sodom and Gomorrah"
 "Ginnungagap"
 "Grand Finale"
 "Lemuria"
 "The Wand of Abaris"
 "Nightside of Eden"
 "To Mega Therion"
 "Thor (The Powerhead) : Manowar cover"

Bonus video
"Drum Battle in Holland"

Vinyl release
Live Gothic has been also released as limited edition of four LP vinyl (33⅓ rpm), gatefold cover and it has been released in 500 hand-numbered copies.

Personnel
 Christofer Johnsson – guitar
 Kristian Niemann – lead and rhythm guitars
 Johan Niemann – bass guitar
 Petter Karlsson – drums, additional vocals on "Thor (The Powerhead)"
 Mats Levén – vocals, additional percussion on "Ginnungagap"
 Snowy Shaw – vocals, additional percussion on "Ginnungagap"
 Katarina Lilja – vocals
 Lori Lewis - vocals

Charts

References

 

2008 live albums
2008 video albums
Live video albums
Therion (band) live albums
Therion (band) video albums
Nuclear Blast live albums
Nuclear Blast video albums